Sarah Elliott is the name of:
Sarah Barnwell Elliott (1848–1928), American novelist
Sarah Elliott (cricketer) (born 1982), Australian cricket player
Sarah Elliott (speed skater) (born 1982), American speed skater